Place-Saint-Henri station is a Montreal Metro station in the borough of Le Sud-Ouest in Montreal, Quebec, Canada. It is operated by the Société de transport de Montréal (STM) and serves the Orange Line. It is located in the Saint-Henri neighbourhood.

The station opened on April 28, 1980, as the western terminus of the first extension of the Orange Line, replacing Bonaventure station as the terminus until the extension to Snowdon station opened in 1981.

Overview 
The station was designed by Julien Hébert and Jean-Louis Lalonde. The station is a normal side platform station, connected by long stairwells to a large mezzanine. The station has three accesses; one is a conventional access within a bus loop, while the other two are open-air staircases linked to an underground gallery connected to the mezzanine. These make Place-Saint-Henri one of the only three stations in Montreal to have uncovered accesses (with Bonaventure and Square-Victoria-OACI station).

Station improvements
In November 2020, work began at the station to make it universally accessible. As part of this project, the Saint-Jacques North and South exits will be closed, and new entrance buildings with elevators will be built. Place Saint-Henri will also be refurbished. During construction, the main entrance on Saint-Ferdinand will remain open. The two entrances and elevators are expected to be completed by Fall 2023.

Artwork 
The station originally contained two artworks: a mural by Hébert in the mezzanine, entitled Bonheur d'occasion, featuring the title of the famous book by Gabrielle Roy (in English called The Tin Flute), set in the neighbourhood; and a motorized mobile sculpture by Jacques de Tonnancour suspended in the mezzanine and over the platforms.

In 2001, a statue of Jacques Cartier by Joseph-Arthur Vincent (originally created in 1896), was moved to the station and placed in a light shaft over the Côte-Vertu platform. It had formerly crowned a fountain in a nearby park, but was removed, moved to the station, and replaced with a copy after it crumbled due to exposure.

Origin of the name
This station is named for place Saint-Henri, a short street and public square between rue Saint-Jacques and rue Notre-Dame. The place and the district took their name from a chapel built in 1810 and placed under the protection of Saint Henry, possibly to commemorate Henri-Auguste Roux (1798–1831), superior of Saint-Sulpice Seminary.

Connecting bus routes

Nearby points of interest

École secondaire Saint-Henri - École des métiers du Sud-Ouest
Piscine Saint-Henri
Parc Saint-Henri
CLSC Saint-Henri
Parc Sir-Georges-Étienne-Cartier
POPIR Comité Logement
Institut technique Aviron
Parc Louis-Cyr
Théâtre Dôme
Musée des ondes Emile-Berliner

Film and television appearances 
Scenes from Denys Arcand's film Jésus de Montréal ("Jesus of Montreal") were filmed in the station.

References

External links
Place-Saint-Henri Station, official web page
Place-Saint-Henri metro station geo location
Montreal by Metro, metrodemontreal.com - photos, information, and trivia
 2011 STM System Map
 Metro Map

Orange Line (Montreal Metro)
Railway stations in Canada opened in 1980
Le Sud-Ouest
1980 establishments in Quebec